Contraception is birth control, the use of methods or devices to prevent unwanted pregnancy.

Contraception may also refer to:
 Contraception (journal), a peer-reviewed journal covering reproductive medicine
 Contraception (veterinary), specifically related to dogs and cats